Jackpine Remnant Provincial Park is a provincial park in British Columbia, Canada, in the area of the community of Fort Nelson. The park is near the crossing of BC Highway 77 (Fort Nelson-Fort Simpson, Northwest Territories highway) over the Fort Nelson River, northwest of the town.

References

External links
Approved Purpose Statement and Zoning Plan

Provincial parks of British Columbia
Fort Nelson Country
Year of establishment missing